For the 2010–11 season, Carlisle United F.C. competed in Football League One.

Players

First-team squad
Squad at end of season

Left club during season

Competitions

League One

League table

Results summary

Results by round

Results

FA Cup

League Cup

Football League Trophy

Notes

References

Carlisle United F.C. seasons
Carlisle United